Liquido was a German rock band formed in Sinsheim, Germany, in 1996 by four friends: Wolle Maier (drums, programming), Wolfgang Schrödl (vocals, guitar, keyboard, piano), Stefan Schulte-Holthaus (bass) and Tim Eiermann (vocals, guitar). The vast majority of their songs are sung in English. Their debut single “Narcotic” recorded in 1997 was a hit in many European countries in 1998. This song was later remixed and become a German, Austrian and Dutch hit for YouNotUs in 2019.

Discography

Studio albums
 Liquido (Virgin, 1999)
 At the Rocks (Virgin, 2000)
 Alarm! Alarm! (Virgin / EMI, 2002)
 Float (Nuclear Blast, 2005)
 Zoomcraft (Nuclear Blast, 2008)

Compilation albums
 The Essential (Virgin, 2004)

Demo EP
 Narcotic (Seven Music, 1997)

Singles

References

German musical groups
Musical groups established in 1996
Musical groups disestablished in 2009
Nuclear Blast artists
Extensive Music artists